Hans Henrik Andreasen also known as HH (born 10 January 1979) is a Danish former professional footballer and current manager of Glejbjerg SF.

Club career

Esbjerg fB & Greuther Fürth
He played for German side SpVgg Greuther Fürth between 2005 and 2007. Before playing abroad in Fürth, he broke through in Danish football, playing for Esbjerg fB. He was one of the players who established Esbjerg in the Danish Superliga, in the first five years of the new millennium. After his transfer to Germany, he was a regular in the starting lineup.

OB
In the summer of 2007, he returned to Denmark to play for Odense Boldklub.
For a midfielder, he was a prolific goal scorer, and he went on to score 47 goals i 211 appearances for OB. 37 were scored in his 166 matches in the domestic league, before he moved back to Esbjerg in January 2013.

Ringkøbing IF
After leaving Hobro in the summer 2016, Andreasen signed for amateur club Ringkøbing IF as a playing assistant manager. He left the club at the end of 2017.

International career
Andreasen has played 11 matches, in which he scored two goals, for the Danish national youth teams. He made his debut for the Danish national team on 17 November 2010, in the friendly match against Czech Republic.

Coaching career
On 8 March 2020, Andreasen was appointed assistant manager of Danish 2nd Division club FC Sydvest 05. On 25 June 2018, he was then promoted to manager of the club. After a bad start to the 2019–20 season, with 12 points in 13 games, Andreason was fired on 21 October 2019.

In February 2022 it was confirmed, that Andreasen had been appointed manager of Danish amateur club Glejbjerg SF.

References

Hobro henter Hans Henrik Andreasen, bold.dk, 18 January 2016
Hobro siger farvel til syv spillere‚ bold.dk, 31 May 2016

External links
 Danish national team profile 
 Career statistics at Danmarks Radio 
 

1979 births
Living people
People from Ringkøbing-Skjern Municipality
Danish men's footballers
Danish expatriate men's footballers
Danish football managers
Denmark international footballers
Denmark under-21 international footballers
Varde IF players
Esbjerg fB players
SpVgg Greuther Fürth players
Odense Boldklub players
Hobro IK players
Ringkøbing IF players
Danish Superliga players
Danish 2nd Division players
2. Bundesliga players
Danish expatriate sportspeople in Germany
Expatriate footballers in Germany
Association football midfielders
FC Sydvest 05 managers
Sportspeople from the Central Denmark Region